The 1997 Atlanta Braves season marked the franchise's 32nd season in Atlanta and 127th overall. The Braves won their seventh consecutive division title, taking the National League East title by 9 games over the second place Florida Marlins. However, the Marlins would later defeat the Braves in the 1997 National League Championship Series. 1997 was the first year that the Braves played their home games in Turner Field, a reconstruction of the former Centennial Olympic Stadium, which originally served as the main venue for the 1996 Summer Olympics.

Off season
 November 20, 1996: John Smoltz was signed as a free agent with the Atlanta Braves.
 November 25, 1996: Paul Byrd was traded by the New York Mets with a player to be named later to the Atlanta Braves for Greg McMichael. The New York Mets sent Andy Zwirchitz (minors) (May 25, 1997) to the Atlanta Braves to complete the trade.
 December 19, 1996: Mike Bielecki was signed as a free agent with the Atlanta Braves.
 March 25, 1997: Kenny Lofton was traded by the Cleveland Indians with Alan Embree to the Atlanta Braves for Marquis Grissom and David Justice.

Regular season
The first game at Turner Field took place on April 4, 1997, with Denny Neagle making the start for the Braves.

Opening day starters
 Kenny Lofton – CF
 Mark Lemke – 2B
 Chipper Jones – 3B
 Fred McGriff – 1B
 Ryan Klesko – LF
 Michael Tucker – RF
 Javy López – C
 Jeff Blauser – SS
 John Smoltz – P

Season standings

Record vs. opponents

Roster

Player stats

Batting

Starters by position
Note: Pos = Position; G = Games played; AB = At bats; H = Hits; Avg. = Batting average; HR = Home runs; RBI = Runs batted in

Other batters
Note: G = Games played; AB = At bats; H = Hits; Avg. = Batting average; HR = Home runs; RBI = Runs batted in

Pitching

Starting pitchers
Note; G = Games pitched, IP = Innings pitched; W = Wins; L = Losses; ERA = Earned run average; SO = Strikeouts

Other pitchers
Note: G = Games pitched; IP = Innings pitched; W = Wins; L = Losses; ERA = Earned run average; SO = Strikeouts

Relief pitchers
Note: G = Games pitched; W = Wins; L = Losses; SV = Saves; ERA = Earned run average; SO = Strikeouts

Turner Field
In 1997, the Braves moved into Turner Field. The ballpark was built across the street from the former home of the Braves, Atlanta–Fulton County Stadium, which was demolished in the summer of 1997.

The most popular name choice among Atlanta residents for the new stadium at the time of its construction (according to a poll in the Atlanta Journal-Constitution) was Hank Aaron Stadium.  After the ballpark was instead named after Ted Turner, the city of Atlanta renamed the section of Capitol Avenue on which the stadium sits Hank Aaron Drive, giving Turner Field the street number 755, after Aaron's home run total.

After the 1996 Summer Olympics were complete the stadium was officially given as a gift to the Atlanta National League Baseball Club, Inc. (the Atlanta Braves) Ted Turner, then owner of the Braves, agreed to pay a large sum of the cost to build Centennial Olympic Stadium (approximately $170 million of the $209 million bill), if in turn, the stadium was built in a way that it could be converted to a new baseball stadium and that the Atlanta Committee for the Olympic Games (ACOG) paid for the conversion. This was considered a good agreement for both the Olympic Committee and the Braves, because there would be no use for a permanent 85,000 seat track and field stadium in Downtown Atlanta (as the 71,000 seat Georgia Dome was completed four years earlier by the state of Georgia) and the Braves had already been exploring opportunities for a new stadium.

1997 National League Division Series

Houston Astros vs. Atlanta Braves
Atlanta wins the series, 3-0

1997 National League Championship Series

Farm system 

LEAGUE CHAMPIONS: Greenville

References

External links
 1997 Atlanta Braves at Baseball Reference
 Braves on Baseball Almanac

Atlanta Braves seasons
Atlanta Braves Season, 1997
National League East champion seasons
Atlanta Braves Season, 1997
Atlanta